The Asian Film Festival of Dallas (AFFD) is a film festival held annually in July or August in Dallas, Texas. The festival programming consists of international films from Asia as well as Asian-American features and shorts. The festival is held primarily at Landmark Theatres' Magnolia Theatre in the  West Village, Dallas, Texas. With a typical slate of 25-30 feature films and 20 short films, the week-long festival is the largest Asian-themed film festival in the southwestern United States.

The festival presents jury prizes for best short and feature films entered in competition, as well as an Audience Award.

History 

The Asian Film Festival of Dallas began in March 2002 as a four-day-long curated festival presenting 12 features from 5 countries. Films screened in the first year included the Dallas premiere of Battle Royale (film) and repertory screenings of classic Asian films, such as Raise the Red Lantern and Seven Samurai. The festival was founded by Dallas local and aspiring filmmaker Mye Hoang as a way to share Asian films with Dallas audiences.

The festival expanded to a week-long event in 2003 and added a juried competition.

Audience Award Winners 

2009 Ip Man (film)
2010 Mao's Last Dancer (film)

References

External links 
 The Asian Film Festival of Dallas Web Site

Asian-American culture in the Dallas–Fort Worth metroplex
Film festivals in Dallas
Asian-American film festivals

Film festivals established in 2001